The 1960 Motocross World Championship was the 4th edition of the Motocross World Championship organized by the FIM and reserved for 500cc and 250cc motorcycles.

Summary
Team Husqvarna's Rolf Tibblin had an early lead in the championship by winning the first two Grand Prix races of the year however, the battle for the title came down to fellow Swedes Bill Nilsson (Husqvarna) and Sten Lundin (Monark). Nilsson prevailed by a narrow 2 point margin to claim the second 500cc world championship of his career. Dave Bickers riding for the Greeves factory racing team claimed the 250cc European Motocross Championship over his countryman, Jeff Smith.

Grands Prix

500cc

250cc

Final standings

Points are awarded to the top 6 classified finishers.

500cc

250cc

Notes

References

Motocross World Championship seasons
Motocross World Championship